was a minor feudal domain under the Tokugawa shogunate of Edo-period Japan, located in Shimōsa Province (the northern portion of Chiba Prefecture Japan. It was centered on what is now part of the town of Tako in Katori District. It was ruled for most of its history by the Matsudaira (Hisamatsu) clan.

History
Tako Domain was originally created for Hoshina Masamitsu in 1590, a retainer of Tokugawa Ieyasu. After the Battle of Sekigahara, he was transferred to Takatō Domain, and Tako Domain passed into the tenryō territories directly controlled by the Tokugawa shogunate, and administered by hatamoto, which included members of the Matsudaira (Hisamatsu) clan.

In 1713, Matsudaira Katsuyuki, who administered 8000 koku within Katori District, gained an additional 3000 koku of revenue in Settsu Province. The combined amount of 12,000 koku was enough to qualify him as a daimyō and Tako Domain was revived. He was allowed to build a jin'ya in what later become the town of Omigawa, Chiba, where his successors continued to rule until the Meiji Restoration.

Holdings at the end of the Edo period
As with most domains in the han system, Tako Domain consisted of several discontinuous territories calculated to provide the assigned kokudaka, based on periodic cadastral surveys and projected agricultural yields.

Shimōsa Province
5 villages in Katori District
Mutsu Province (Iwaki)
6 villages in Ishikawa District
7 villages in Naraha District
Shimotsuke Province
6 villages in Tsuga District
1 village in Kawachi District

List of daimyō

References

Bolitho, Harold (1974). Treasures among men; the fudai daimyo in Tokugawa Japan. New Haven: Yale University Press.
Kodama Kōta 児玉幸多, Kitajima Masamoto 北島正元 (1966). Kantō no shohan 関東の諸藩. Tokyo: Shin Jinbutsu Ōraisha.

External links
 Genealogy of the lords of Tako

Notes

Domains of Japan
1594 establishments in Japan
States and territories established in 1594
1871 disestablishments in Japan
States and territories disestablished in 1871
Shimōsa Province
History of Chiba Prefecture